Amorbia osmotris is a species of moth of the family Tortricidae. It is found in Costa Rica, where it is found at altitudes above 2,000 meters.

The length of the forewings is 12–14 mm for males and 14–15 mm for females. The ground colour of the forewings is light brown with a variable pattern, ranging from faint to well-developed bands or patches. The hindwings are white with grey mottling toward the apex. Adults are on wing year round.

The larvae feed on Rubus species, Weinmannia pinnata, Pernetia coriaceae, Vaccinium species and Quercus costaricensis.

References

Moths described in 1932
Sparganothini
Moths of Central America